Ou Guangchen (Wuchuan Dialect: Au Guongsan),  courtesy name Dai Huang (Wuchuan Dialect: Dai Wuong), (? 〜1653), was a Chinese Intellectual and a leader of militia who fought against the Qing invader. He was born in Bopu, 
Wuchuan, Guangdong.

Life Experience

Early life 
Ou Guangchen was born in a scholarly family in Bopu, Wuchuan, Guangdong. In 1627, Ou Guangchen took the Provincial Examination(鄉試) and obtained a Juren(舉人) degree.

See also 
Ming Dynasty

Southern Ming

Queue Order

External links 
欧 光 宸 传 略 吴川市人民政府
吴川县志大事记 吴川市人民政府

1653 deaths
Year of birth missing
Ming dynasty people
Ming dynasty generals
History of Guangdong